Louis Wendlin Sauer (born August 13, 1885 in Cincinnati; d. February 10, 1980 in Miami) was an American pediatrician who became known for perfecting the vaccine used to prevent pertussis (whooping cough), saving countless lives around the world. After five years of work, Dr. Sauer developed the vaccine in 1931, inoculating children against pertussis, a respiratory infection that had been the most fatal disease for children under two years old. He later developed the DPT vaccine, which allowed the vaccines for diphtheria, pertussis and tetanus to be administered as a single injection. Dr. Sauer never asked for compensation for developing vaccines and told an interviewer later, "One doesn't do that thing for money."

Sauer was born in Cincinnati, met his wife Mira while he was in Germany as he was a medical student, and established a practice at Evanston Hospital, in Evanston, a suburb of Chicago, Illinois. He earned an MD in Berlin and his PhD at the University of Chicago. Dr. Sauer was a professor at the Northwestern University Medical School in Evanston, Illinois, until his retirement in 1959 to Coral Gables, Florida. He died at age 94 of pneumonia and congestive heart failure.

References 

1885 births
1980 deaths
American pediatricians
Deaths from pneumonia in Florida
Physicians from Cincinnati